Dictyoporthe is a genus of fungi within the Melanconidaceae family.

References

External links
Dictyoporthe at Index Fungorum

Melanconidaceae